The 2019 Canadian Wheelchair Curling Championship was held April 26 - May 1 at the Club de curling de Boucherville in Boucherville, Quebec.

Teams
The teams are as follows:

Standings
Final round robin standings

Playoffs

Qualification
Tuesday, April 30, 10:00

Semifinal
Tuesday, April 30, 19:00

Bronze-medal game
Wednesday, May 1, 12:00

Final
Wednesday, May 1, 12:00

References

External links
Official site 

2019 in Quebec
2019 in Canadian curling
Curling in Quebec
Canadian Wheelchair Curling Championships